"Wild Tiger Woman" is a song recorded by the Move, and as with all the other A-sides of their singles, written by Roy Wood. First issued as their fifth single, it failed to chart on the UK Singles Chart, despite all previous singles having reached the top-5 on that chart.

Background and recording
"Wild Tiger Woman" was much heavier than the band's earlier singles, bearing the influence of Jimi Hendrix, whom the group greatly admired and had often played on the same bill with.  Wood and rhythm / bass guitarist Trevor Burton had sung backing vocals on the track "You've Got Me Floating" from The Jimi Hendrix Experience's album Axis: Bold as Love. For the "Wild Tiger Woman" session, musician Nicky Hopkins played piano. According to Wood, producer Denny Cordell was not present for the mixing of the track and so it was handled by the band themselves and the engineer, which he felt resulted in an inferior mix.

According to Burton, "It had the heavier rock'n'roll sound we should have been playing all along, and I really thought it was on its way to the very top." Wood was less enthusiastic: "The song's all right. I wouldn't choose to sing it now."

Reception
Unlike their first four singles, which had all reached the UK top five, it did not even make the Top 40. A factor in this failure to chart may have lay in the lyrics which included the line "tied to the bed, she's waiting to be fed", which led to the single being banned from Radio 1. Another factor was that the single's mono mix was muffled, as compared to prior Move singles. (A recent first-time stereo mix shows that the tune was nicely recorded, just initially poorly mixed.)

Its failure was a disappointment to the rest of the group, who conceded that it had been something of a mistake, and that the more melodic B-side, "Omnibus", would have been a more suitable A-side instead. They announced that they would probably disband if their subsequent single did likewise. The song that they chose for it, "Blackberry Way", became a number 1 hit, however, and so the group did not disband until 1972, when they were supplanted by Electric Light Orchestra.

Personnel 
The Move

 Carl Wayne – lead, harmony and backing vocals
 Roy Wood – lead, harmony and backing vocals, guitars
 Trevor Burton – lead, harmony and backing vocals, bass guitar
 Bev Bevan – drums

Additional personnel

 Nicky Hopkins – piano

References 

The Move songs
Songs written by Roy Wood
1968 singles
Song recordings produced by Denny Cordell
Regal Zonophone Records singles
1968 songs